myBlueprint is a Canadian education technology company. Its primary product, Education Planner is designed to help with secondary school course selections, and career planning for youth and young adults.

The platform is currently in use by more than 360 school boards representing over 6,500 schools and over 1,000,000 users, including the Toronto District School Board, among other Canadian districts.  In 2020, the company had 35 full-time staff.

History 
myBlueprint was founded as a research project by two graduates of Western University's Ivey Business School in 2005.

Products 
myBlueprint offers three core products: Education Planner (for Grades 7–12), All About Me (for Grades K-6) and Spaces (Grades K–12). Over fifteen years, the company's products have served more than 2.5 million students.

In 2018, myBlueprint announced a partnership with OCAS to create direct apply experiences for college applicants from the Education Planner program.

Education Planner 
Education Planner includes personality self-assessments, tools to explore high school courses, post-secondary pathways, and career options, as well as build budgets, resumes, and cover letters, as well as create portfolios.  Schools can also use Education Planner to administer course selection.

All About Me 
All About Me offers career exploration and portfolio tools for a younger student audience and features mini-games and family accounts.

Spaces 
Spaces, the company's newest product, debuted in 2020 as an early access product for K–12 classrooms. The new product is a subject-agnostic, digital portfolio tool that offers a web-based platform, as well as iOS and Android applications.

References

Internet properties established in 2005
Canadian educational websites